Paul Millar may refer to:
Paul Millar (footballer, born 1966), Northern Irish footballer and manager
Paul Millar (Scottish footballer) (born 1988), player for Elgin City
Paul Millar (academic), professor of English literature and digital humanities at the University of Canterbury

See also
Paul Miller (disambiguation)